Jean-Louis Vieillard-Baron (born 19 April 1944) is a French Roman Catholic philosopher. He is Professor Emeritus of Philosophy at the University of Poitiers and Professor of the Philosophy of Religion at the Institut Catholique de Paris. He is the author of many books about Bergson and Hegel. He is an expert on spiritualism.

Early life
Jean-Louis Vieillard-Baron was born in 1944. He entered the École normale supérieure de Saint-Cloud in 1965. He received the Agrégation in 1969 and a Doctorate in Philosophy in 1976.

Career
Vieillard-Baron was a professor of philosophy at the University of Poitiers, where he was the director of a research centre about Karl Marx and Hegel, later about Hegel and German idealism. Additionally, he was the recipient of fellowships from the Alexander von Humboldt Foundation to conduct research at the Hegel-Archiv. He was also the founder and president of the Association Louis Lavelle in 1989.

Vieillard-Baron is Professor of the Philosophy of Religion at the Institut Catholique de Paris. He is an expert on spiritualism.

Works

References

1944 births
Living people
ENS Fontenay-Saint-Cloud-Lyon alumni
Academic staff of the University of Poitiers
Academic staff of the Institut Catholique de Paris
French philosophers
Philosophers of religion
Catholic philosophers
People from Paris
21st-century French philosophers